György Zala may refer to:
 György Zala (canoeist)
 György Zala (sculptor)